Batocera frenchi is a species of beetle in the family Cerambycidae. It was described by Van de Poll in 1886. It is known from Australia. Batocera frenchi is one of the species which caused the cane toad to be brought into Australia in June 1935.

References

Batocerini
Beetles described in 1886